Cristián Escalante (born September 11, 1976 in Santiago) is a Chilean a weightlifter competing in the +105 kg category. Escalante has competed in three Pan American Games starting in 1999. Escalante in 1996 became the first weightlifter to qualify for the Olympics from Chile.

After placing silver at the 1999 and winning the silver medal at the 2003 Pan American Games, Escalante finally won a gold medal at the 2007 Pan American Games in Rio de Janeiro.

In September 2011, Escalante was named the flag bearer for the Chilean team at the 2011 Pan American Games in Guadalajara, Mexico. Escalante was scheduled to compete in his fourth Pan American Games, however he did not carry the flag or compete after testing positive for steroids.

Major results

Note: 
1 After the competition he was fourth place, but later the originally silver medalist Cuban Modesto Sánchez and bronze medalist Puerto Rican Edries González was disqualified for used banned substances.

References

External links
 
 
 

1976 births
Living people
Chilean male weightlifters
Olympic weightlifters of Chile
Pan American Games gold medalists for Chile
Pan American Games medalists in weightlifting
Pan American Games silver medalists for Chile
Weightlifters at the 1996 Summer Olympics
Weightlifters at the 1999 Pan American Games
Weightlifters at the 2003 Pan American Games
Weightlifters at the 2007 Pan American Games
Medalists at the 2007 Pan American Games
Sportspeople from Santiago
20th-century Chilean people
21st-century Chilean people